Poland's Ministry of Finance, headed by the Minister of Finance (Minister Finansów), is part of the government of Poland. Among its powers and responsibilities it drafts the national budget, deals with taxes, financing of the local self-governments and issues related to public debt.

In the area of taxation, the ministry oversees a system of local and regional tax offices. A local tax office is called urząd skarbowy ("tax office"), while a higher-level office is called izba administracji skarbowej ("revenue administration regional office"). There are approximately 400 of the former throughout the country, and 16 of the latter, one in each voivodeship (province). In each voivodeship there is also one "customs and tax control office" (urząd celno-skarbowy).

The Ministry of Finance existed alongside the Ministry of the Treasury, which was responsible mainly for the management of nationally owned assets, and the Ministry of the Economy.

Headquarters
The Ministry of Finance building is located in the quarter of Świętokrzyska, Czackiego, Traugutta and Krakowskie Przedmieście streets in Warsaw

It is an example of socialist realist architecture. In 2012, it was entered in the register of monuments.

The building was erected in 1953-1956 for the Ministry of Treasury. It was designed by Stanisław Bieńkuński and Stanisław Rychłowski.

The architecture combines the features of modernism with the canons of socialist realism style, while applying the palace assumptions of the Renaissance and Baroque period.

List of ministers
Below is a list of Finance Ministers of Poland.

Second Republic
 Władysław Byrka, 18.11.1918 - 16.01.1919
 Józef Englich, 16.01.1919 - 04.04.1919
 Stanisław Karpiński, 04.04.1919 - 31.07.1919
 Leon Biliński, 31.07.1919 - 9.12.1919
 Władysław Grabski, 13.12.1919 - 26.11.1920
 Jan Kanty Steczkowski, 26.11.1920 - 18.09.1921
 Bolesław Markowski, 19.09.1921 - 26.09.1921
 Jerzy Michalski, 26.09.1921 - 02.06.1922
 Zygmunt Jastrzębski, 28.06.1922 - 02.01.1923
 Bolesław Markowski, 09.01.1923 - 13.01.1923
 Władysław Grabski, 13.01.1923 - 01.07.1923
 Hubert Linde, 01.07.1923 - 30.08.1923
 Władysław Kucharski, 01.09.1923 - 14.12.1923
 Władysław Grabski, 19.12.1923 - 14.11.1925
 Jerzy Zdziechowski, 20.11.1925 - 15.05.1926
 Gabriel Czechowicz, 15.05.1926 - 04.06.1926
 Czesław Klarner, 08.06.1926 - 30.09.1926
 Gabriel Czechowicz, 02.10.1926 - 08.03.1929
 Ignacy Matuszewski, 14.04.1929 - 26.05.1931
 Jan Piłsudski, 27.05.1931 - 05.09.1932
 Władysław Marian Zawadzki, 05.09.1932 - 28.02.1935
 Eugeniusz Kwiatkowski, 12.10.1935 - 17.09.1939
 Henryk Leon Strasburger, (1939–1942, Polish government in exile)
Source:

Polish People's Republic (1947–1989) 
Konstanty Dąbrowski, 07.03.1950 - 20.11.1952
Tadeusz Ditrich, 21.11.1952 - 28.07.1960
Jerzy Albrecht, 16.11.1960 - 15.07.1968
Stanisław Majewski, 15.07.1968 - 30.06.1969
Józef Trendota, 01.07.1969 - 22.12.1971
Stefan Jędrychowski, 22.12.1971 - 21.11.1974
Henryk Kisiel, 21.11.1974 - 24.08.1980
Marian Krzak, 24.08.1980 - 10.10.1982
Stanisław Nieckarz, 09.10.1982 - 17.07.1986
Bazyli Samojlik, 17.07.1986 - 13.10.1988
Andrzej Wróblewski, 14.10.1988 - 12.09.1989
Source:

Third Republic (since 1989) 
 Leszek Balcerowicz (12 September 1989 – 5 December 1991)
 Karol Lutkowski (23 December 1991 – 26 February 1992)
 Andrzej Olechowski (26 February 1992 – 5 June 1992)
 Jerzy Osiatyński (11 July 1992 – 26 October 1993)
 Marek Borowski (26 October 1993 – 8 February 1994)
 Grzegorz Kołodko (28 April 1994 – 4 February 1997)
 Marek Belka (4 February 1997 – 17 October 1997)
 Leszek Balcerowicz (31 October 1997 – 8 June 2000)
 Jarosław Bauc (8 June 2000 – 28 August 2001)
 Halina Wasilewska-Trenkner (28 August 2001 – 19 October 2001)
 Marek Belka (19 October 2001 – 6 July 2002)
 Grzegorz Kołodko (6 July 2002 – 16 June 2003)
 Andrzej Raczko (16 June 2003 – 21 July 2004)
 Mirosław Gronicki (21 July 2004 – 31 October 2005)
 Teresa Lubińska (31 October 2005 – 7 January 2006)
 Zyta Gilowska (7 January 2006 – 24 June 2006)
 Paweł Wojciechowski (24 June 2006 – 10 July 2006)
 Stanisław Kluza (14 July 2006 - 22 September 2006)
 Zyta Gilowska (22 September 2006 - 16 November 2007)
 Jan Vincent-Rostowski (16 November 2007 – 27 November 2013)
 Mateusz Szczurek (27 November 2013 – 16 November 2015)
 Paweł Szałamacha (16 November 2015 – 28 September 2016)
 Mateusz Morawiecki (28 September 2016 – 9 January 2018)
 Teresa Czerwińska (9 January 2018 – 4 June 2019)
 Marian Banaś (4 June 2019 – 30 August 2019)
 Mateusz Morawiecki (30 August 2019 – 20 September 2019)
 Jerzy Kwieciński (20 September 2019 - 15 November 2019)
 Tadeusz Kościński (15 November 2019 - 9 February 2022)
 Mateusz Morawiecki (acting since 9 February 2022)
Source:

References

External links
  Ministry of Finance of the Republic of Poland

Poland, Finance
 
Finance Ministers
Poland
Finance
Poland, Finance
Finance in Poland
Government finances in Poland